Gmina Czermin may refer to either of the following rural administrative districts in Poland:
Gmina Czermin, Subcarpathian Voivodeship
Gmina Czermin, Greater Poland Voivodeship